Mohamed El-Saharty (born 26 July 1990) is an Egyptian gymnast. He competed at the 2012 Summer Olympics.

References

External links
 

1990 births
Living people
Egyptian male artistic gymnasts
Olympic gymnasts of Egypt
Gymnasts at the 2012 Summer Olympics
Sportspeople from Giza
African Games medalists in gymnastics
Competitors at the 2015 African Games
African Games gold medalists for Egypt
African Games silver medalists for Egypt
African Games bronze medalists for Egypt
20th-century Egyptian people
21st-century Egyptian people